Pass out may refer to:

Syncope (medicine), the act of losing consciousness
Passing out (military), completing a course by military and other service personnel
"Pass Out" (song), a song by Tinie Tempah
"Pass Out", a song by Chris Brown from the album Graffiti
Pass-Out, a drinking board game by Frank Bresee